Yirrkala insolitus is an eel in the family Ophichthidae (worm/snake eels). It was described by John E. McCosker in 1999. It is a marine, tropical eel which is known from New Caledonia, in the western Pacific Ocean.

The species epithet "insolitus" means "strange" or "unusual".

References

Ophichthidae
Fish described in 1999